Peptidoglycan-N-acetylglucosamine deacetylase (HP310, PgdA, SpPgdA, BC1960, peptidoglycan deacetylase, N-acetylglucosamine deacetylase, peptidoglycan GlcNAc deacetylase, peptidoglycan N-acetylglucosamine deacetylase, PG N-deacetylase) is an enzyme with systematic name peptidoglycan-N-acetylglucosamine amidohydrolase. This enzyme catalyses the following chemical reaction

 peptidoglycan-N-acetyl-D-glucosamine + H2O  peptidoglycan-D-glucosamine + acetate

This enzyme contributes to virulence of Helicobacter pylori, Listeria monocytogenes and Streptococcus suis.

References

External links 
 

EC 3.5.1